The women's Laser Radial competition at the 2016 Summer Olympics in Rio de Janeiro took place between 8–16 August at Marina da Glória. Eleven races (the last one a medal race) were scheduled. Due to weather conditions the medal race was postponed a day.

Schedule

Results

Further reading

References 

 

Women's Laser Radial
Laser Radial
Women's events at the 2016 Summer Olympics
Olym